Lophiotoma pseudoannulata is a species of sea snail, a marine gastropod mollusk in the family Turridae, the turrids.

Description
The length of the shell attains 20 mm.

Distribution
This species occurs in the Ross Sea, Antarctica at a depth of 1890 m.

References

 Dell, R. K. (1990). Antarctic Mollusca with special reference to the fauna of the Ross Sea. Bulletin of the Royal Society of New Zealand, Wellington 27: 1–311
 Engl, W. (2012). Shells of Antarctica. Hackenheim: Conchbooks. 402 pp.

External links
 Kantor Y.I., Harasewych M.G. & Puillandre N. (2016). A critical review of Antarctic Conoidea (Neogastropoda). Molluscan Research. 36(3): 153-206
 Griffiths, H.J.; Linse, K.; Crame, J.A. (2003). SOMBASE - Southern Ocean mollusc database: a tool for biogeographic analysis in diversity and evolution. Organisms Diversity and Evolution. 3: 207-213

pseudoannulata
Gastropods described in 1990